Donal Foley (1922–1981) was a journalist and newspaper editor. He worked as London editor for The Irish Press

before employment with The Irish Times. He was born in the Ring Gaeltacht in 1922 and grew up in Ferrybank.

Foley wrote the satirical column "Man Bites Dog" in The Irish Times from 1971 until his death in 1981.

His autobiography is called The Three Villages.

References

1922 births
1981 deaths
Irish satirists
The Irish Press people
The Irish Times people
People from County Waterford